San Bernardo, is a railway station of the Empresa de los Ferrocarriles del Estado, located in San Bernardo, Chile. It is located on Baquedano street.

San Bernardo is part of the Red Sur EFE, and all passenger traffic stops here.

Lines and trains 
The following train services pass through San Bernardo:

Red Sur EFE
TerraSur (inter-city rail) (Alameda - Chillán)
Metrotrén Rancagua (regional-commuter rail) (Alameda - Rancagua)
Metrotrén Nos (commuter rail) (Alameda - Nos)

External links 
 Empresa de los Ferrocarriles del Estado
 Metrotrén
 Terrasur

San Bernardo
Buildings and structures in Santiago Metropolitan Region
Transport in Santiago Metropolitan Region